Qaramqol district is located south of Andkhoy District in the northern part of Faryab province. with an ethnic composition of 5% Pashtun, 35% Uzbek and 60% Turkman.  The district center Qaram Qũl is close to the town of Andkhoy.

References

External links 
 Map of Settlements IMMAP, 2011

Districts of Faryab Province